Vedat Kapurtu (born 30 June 1978) is a Turkish footballer who plays as a goalkeeper for Tokatspor.

Professional career
A youth product of his local side Bakırköyspor, Kapurtu made his professional debut with Sivasspor in a 2-0 Süper Lig loss to Galatasaray on 11 September 2005. Kapurtu spent the later part of his career with Göztepe and Yeni Malatyaspor in the TFF First League.

References

External links
 
 
 

1978 births
Living people
People from Bakırköy
Footballers from Istanbul
Turkish footballers
Yeni Malatyaspor footballers
Göztepe S.K. footballers
Şanlıurfaspor footballers
Mardinspor footballers
Sivasspor footballers
Bakırköyspor footballers
Süper Lig players
TFF First League players
TFF Second League players
Association football goalkeepers